Tommie Boyd (born December 21, 1971) is a former American football wide receiver. He played for the Detroit Lions from 1997 to 1998.

References

1971 births
Living people
American football wide receivers
Toledo Rockets football players
Detroit Lions players